Gagybátor is a village in Borsod-Abaúj-Zemplén County in northeastern Hungary.  it had a population of 240. But in 2009 it was 238.

Landmarks
 United Reformed Church
 Ruins of Jakabfalvy mansion

Notable people
 György Györffy, ethnologist and historian

References

Populated places in Borsod-Abaúj-Zemplén County